Carville is a neighborhood of St. Gabriel in Iberville Parish in South Louisiana, located sixteen miles south of the capital city of Baton Rouge on the Mississippi River. Carville was the childhood hometown of political consultant James Carville, and was named for his grandfather, Louis Arthur Carville, the postmaster.  The ZIP Code for Carville is 70721.

Carville National Leprosarium 
The United States Public Health Service hospital named "Carville National Leprosarium" once existed in this neighborhood, which for a hundred years treated leprosy (now called Hansen's disease) patients. The hospital has since been closed, but several of the buildings remain. 

This former hospital site is now called the Gillis W. Long Center since 1986, named for the late U.S. Representative Gillis William Long, a Democrat from Louisiana's 8th congressional district, and is operated by the Louisiana Army National Guard. The facility now includes the National Hansen’s Disease Museum.

See also 

 Carville Historic District

References

External links

National Hansen's Disease Museum official website
Gillis W. Long Center Web site

Louisiana populated places on the Mississippi River
Unincorporated communities in Iberville Parish, Louisiana
Unincorporated communities in Louisiana